Joseph Horatio Anderson was a British-born Colonial American architect active in Annapolis, Province of Maryland, in the late 18th century.

He designed Whitehall (1764), a plantation house in Anne Arundel County, outside Annapolis. He was the likely designer of the third (and current) Maryland State House (1772). He designed the second St. Anne's Church (designed 1775, completed 1792), also in Annapolis, although the church was not completed until more than a decade after his death.

Quite few details are known of Anderson's life.

In 1770, Anderson sent a letter to Rhode Island College offering his architectural services to the newly established institution. The correspondence, however, arrived only after construction on the college's new building had already begun.

Gallery

References

External links 
 Historical Images of the Maryland State House, Maryland State Archives 

Annapolis, Maryland
Architects from Maryland
18th-century American architects
Year of birth missing
Year of death missing